Taking Lives may refer to:

 Taking Lives (novel), a 1999 thriller novel by Michael Pye
 Taking Lives (film), a 2004 American psychological thriller film, loosely based on the novel
 Taking Lives (album), a 2013 album by Something Awful